The Contemporary Arts Center of New Orleans is an arts complex located in historic downtown New Orleans. Founded in 1976, the center plays host to events and performances from visual arts to concert performances and lectures. General gallery admission is free to Louisiana residents, with varying hours and ticket arrangements for concerts and other special events. The center also regularly offers courses for interested students in numerous different facets of the arts.

References

External links 
 

Culture of New Orleans
Museums in New Orleans
Arts centers in Louisiana